Florence is a city in, and the county seat of, Lauderdale County, Alabama, United States, in the state's northwestern corner. It is situated along the Tennessee River and is home to the University of North Alabama, the oldest college in the state.

Florence is the largest and principal city of the Florence-Muscle Shoals Metropolitan Statistical Area commonly known as "The Shoals" (which also includes the cities of Muscle Shoals, Sheffield, and Tuscumbia in Colbert County). Florence is considered northwestern Alabama's primary economic hub.

Annual tourism events include the W. C. Handy Music Festival in the summer and the Renaissance Faire in the fall. Landmarks in Florence include the 20th-century Rosenbaum House, the only Frank Lloyd Wright-designed home located in Alabama. The Florence Indian Mound, constructed by indigenous people between 100 BCE and 400 BCE in the Woodland period, is the largest surviving earthen mound in the state and is 43 feet high. It is listed on the National Register of Historic Places. It has been protected by the city since 1945. In 2017 a new, expanded museum was built to replace one built in 1968 that displays artifacts and interprets the ancient and historic cultures of all the indigenous peoples in the area.

The type of municipal government is a mayor-council system.

Geography

Florence is located on Wilson Lake and Pickwick Lake, bodies of water on the Tennessee River dammed by Pickwick Dam and Wilson Dams. Pickwick Lake was created by the Tennessee Valley Authority (TVA), an agency established under President Franklin Delano Roosevelt's New Deal. It was a public works program intended to build dams and hydroelectric power and related infrastructure to generate electricity for the rural region to stimulate economic development, provide flood control, and recreational opportunities. Wilson Dam (now operated by the TVA) was authorized by President Woodrow Wilson in 1918 and was the first dam constructed on the Tennessee River.

Climate
The climate in this area is characterized by hot, humid summers and generally mild to cool winters. According to the Köppen Climate Classification system, Florence has a humid subtropical climate, abbreviated "Cfa" on climate maps.

While Florence is almost  from the Gulf of Mexico, strong hurricanes have brought severe weather to the area. For example, in 2005, the path of Hurricane Katrina came very close to the city, causing nearly  winds and some storm damage.

History
Evidence for human habitation in the Florence area goes back to at least 500 BCE, when the Florence Indian Mound, the largest of its type in the Tennessee Valley, was constructed as an earthwork during the Woodland period. Successive cultures arose after this. In the historic period, the area of present-day Florence was occupied by the Chickasaw Nation. They first encountered white traders and settlers beginning in the late 1700s, and were forced to cede their land to the Federal government through a series of treaties in early 1800s, as part of the Indian Removal policy to extinguish tribal land claims east of the Mississippi River. The Chickasaw were removed to west of the river in Indian Territory (now Oklahoma). 

General John Coffee, John McKinley, a future U.S. Supreme Court Justice, and five other trustees established the Cypress Land Company to found a town on a hill overlooking the Tennessee River. The company bought the land, believing that Florence's location along Jackson's Military Road and at the end of the treacherous Muscle Shoals rapids on the Tennessee River would enable it to develop as a major commercial center. In 1819, Coffee commissioned Ferdinand Sannoner, a young Italian engineer, to survey and plan the town. As a reward for his work, Sannoner was allowed to choose the name of the new settlement; he named it after Florence, the capital of the Tuscany region of Italy. 

The first river steamboat visited the town in 1821. Speculators and settlers, including General Andrew Jackson and President James Monroe, bought up plots of land as they were sold by the Cypress Land Co. Florence quickly became a commercial hub on the Tennessee River, but it did not reach the level its founders had hoped. Florence did grow quickly enough to be incorporated by the State Legislature in 1826. 

As a sign of progress and ambition, townspeople established the Florence Female Academy here in 1847, for paying female students. By the 1850s, the school was converted into the Florence Synodical Female College, affiliated with the Presbyterian Church. It closed in 1893. A historical marker commemorates the site.

Demographics

2020

As of the 2020 United States Census, there were 40,184 people, 17,475 households, and 9,718 families residing in the city.

2010
According to the 2010 census:

75.0% White
19.4% Black
0.4% Native American
1.4% Asian
0.1% Native Hawaiian or Pacific Islander
1.9% Two or more races
3.6% Hispanic or Latino (of any race)

2000
As of the census of 2000, there were 36,264 people, 15,820 households, and 9,555 families residing in the city. The racial makeup of the city was 78.39% White, 19.20% Black or African American, 0.24% Native American, 0.62% Asian, 0.03% Pacific Islander, 0.54% from other races, and 0.97% from two or more races. 1.34% of the population were Hispanic or Latino of any race.

There were 15,820 households, out of which 25.9% had children under the age of 18 living with them: 43.6% were married couples living together, 14.0% had a female householder with no husband present, and 39.6% were non-families. Nearly 33.8% of all households were made up of individuals, and 13.3% had someone living alone who was 65 years of age or older. The average household size was 2.20, and the average family size was 2.82.

In the city, the population was spread out, with 21.4% under the age of 18, 13.7% from 18 to 24, 25.7% from 25 to 44, 21.7% from 45 to 64, and 17.5% who were 65 years of age or older. The median age was 37 years. For every 100 females, there were 84.0 males. For every 100 females age 18 and over, there were 79.7 males.

The median income for a household in the city was $28,330, and the median income for a family was $40,577. Males had a median income of $34,398 versus $21,385 for females. The per capita income for the city was $19,464. About 14.4% of families and 20.4% of the population were below the poverty line, including 25.9% of those under age 18 and 13.3% of those age 65 or over.

Education

Situated in Florence, and founded in 1830 as LaGrange College, and later operating as a normal school, the University of North Alabama, a public, co-educational, higher education institution, is Alabama's oldest state-certified university. The university is the largest in North Alabama, with an enrollment topping 7,000 for the first time in 2007. International students now compose roughly 10% of the student population. 

It is located just north of the downtown business district. Kilby Laboratory School, grades K – 6, is affiliated with the university and is the only laboratory school in the state.

Florence City Schools is the organization of the K–12 public school system. Florence High School (grades 10–12) is the main high school, with an enrollment of approximately 1,000 students. It was created by a merger between the previous two city high schools, Bradshaw High School and Coffee High School. Florence High is located at the former Bradshaw site in the eastern part of the city. The merger also led to the creation of Florence Middle School (grades 7–8) and the Florence Freshman Center (grade 9). The middle school is located at the former Coffee High campus, east of downtown, and the Florence Freshman Center is located at the Florence High School campus.

There are five private schools in Florence: Riverhill School for K-6, St. Joseph Regional Catholic School for grades K–8, and Mars Hill Bible School, Shoals Christian School, and Florence Christian Academy. Each of the latter are multi-denominational, K–12 schools.

Government
The city has a mayor-council form of government. Each of the council members is elected from one of six single-member districts. The mayor is elected at-large.

Mayor
Andrew Betterton

Andrew Betterton was elected as the mayor of Florence on October 6, 2020. He defeated incumbent Mayor Steve Holt by 11 votes.

City Council
 District 1: Kaytrina P. Simmons
 District 2: William (Dick) Jordan
 District 3: Bill Griffin
 District 4: Michelle Rupe Eubanks
 District 5: Blake Edwards
 District 6: Andrew Betterton

Culture and events
The City of Florence is home to several museums, historical sites and numerous parks that serve the cultural and recreational needs of citizens and tourists. A variety of festivals are held throughout the year.

Museums
Kennedy Douglass Center for the Arts is the center for numerous cultural activities, exhibits and events. The center showcases artists from around the Southeast United States. It also offers classes and workshops to people of all ages. It is listed on the National Register of Historic Places, and provides administrative offices for Florence's six museums. The museums are open Tuesday – Saturday from 10:00 am to 4:00 pm, Sunday 1:00 pm to 4:00 pm and are closed Monday.
The Indian Mound is the largest of its type in the Tennessee Valley Region. The earthwork mound, which measures 310Hx230Wx42D (feet) and is named Wawmanona, was built circa 500 A.D. in the Woodland period. It is thought to be a locale for tribal ceremony and ritual. Formerly two smaller mounds and an earthen wall were associated with the complex. The Indian Mound Museum displays Native American artifacts from the Mound and the surrounding area, which represent different indigenous cultures dating back 1,000 years.
Pope's Tavern is a renowned historical site. It served as a hospital for Civil War soldiers from both the Union and Confederate armies. It also served as a stagecoach stop, a tavern and an inn. The museum houses Civil War artifacts, as well as antiques from the 18th and 19th centuries. It is one of Florence's oldest standing structures.
The W. C. Handy Home and Museum is dedicated to the noted musician, known as the "father of the blues". Handy was born in a log cabin at this site in 1873. The museum contains a collection of Handy's personal papers, artifacts and other items he donated before his death in 1958.
The Rosenbaum House, at 601 Riverview Drive, is the only building in the state designed by American architect Frank Lloyd Wright, who had an international reputation. It was built in 1939. The house was the first in the city to have such novelties as a carport and under-floor heating. It is open for tours six days of the week.
The Children's Museum of the Shoals contains exhibits displaying the history, people and events that make up the Shoals' history. The museum is designed to promote learning in a hands-on environment. The museum offers educational workshops year-round for children of all ages.
The Forks of Cypress was a large cotton plantation located in Florence. Its remains can be seen in the form of 24 Greek columns, as well as the Jackson Family cemetery. Both are on private property and are not usually open to the public. The local historical society hosts tours sporadically. A scale replica of the plantation home is located in downtown Florence, and is currently used as a Regions bank.

Festivals
The festivals are listed chronologically.

The Sam Phillips Music Celebration is a week-long event held the first week of January. It celebrates the life of Sam Phillips with events that include the Sam Phillips Birthday Party, "Conversations on Sam," Sam Jam Concert, Muscle Shoals to Music Row Live, and a finale concert. Although Phillips is credited for the birth of rock n' roll and the discovery of many acclaimed artists, such as Elvis Presley, he also recorded gospel, rhythm & blues, country and rockabilly artists. This festival started in 2005.
The George Lindsey/UNA Film Festival started in 1997 and is named in honor of George Lindsey. This actor is best known for portraying the character of "Goober Pyle" on the television series The Andy Griffith Show. Lindsey was a UNA (then known as Florence State College) graduate. The event takes place in April.
Arts Alive, in May, was started in 1986. Artists from around the Southeast gather in Wilson Park for two days to show and sell their work.
The Spirit of Freedom Celebration is an annual Fourth of July tradition, presented by the Shoals Radio Group (WLAY-FM, WVNA-FM, WMSR-FM, WMXV, WVNA, and WLAY). Thousands of people gather at McFarland Park, starting in the morning, for a day listening to a variety of musical acts. The celebration concludes around 10:00 p.m. with a fireworks display over the Tennessee River.
The W. C. Handy Music Festival. Every year for a week in late July or early August, musicians from around the country descend upon the Shoals. Area restaurants offer live music, and artists often perform in Wilson Park or along streets downtown. Though the focus was originally on blues and jazz, the musical genres now include rock, country, gospel and others. The festival, the largest in the Shoals area, also includes educational events, art shows, and athletic competitions.
Every September, Florence is the termination point for riders in the annual Trail of Tears Remembrance Motorcycle Ride across the state, which ends in nearby Waterloo, Alabama. The ride commemorates the forced removal of Southeastern tribes by the federal government to west of the Mississippi River to Indian Territory (now Oklahoma) by the Indian Removal Act of 1830.
Shoals Fest is held at McFarland Park during the first weekend in October. The festival began in 2019, created by Jason Isbell of Green Hill.
The Alabama Renaissance Faire is held in Wilson Park during the fourth weekend in October. The festival celebrates Florence's heritage as the "Renaissance City" by recreating the feel of a medieval fair. Activities include arts and crafts, magicians, reenactments and musical performances. Festivalgoers are invited to dress in period clothing.
First Fridays in Florence is an arts and music event occurring every first Friday from April to December in downtown Florence. The nine months of art and music nights began in 2005. The city's downtown development efforts, including First Fridays events, were featured as a "wise" community in the EPA Smart Growth publication This is Smart Growth.

Other attractions
Braly Municipal Stadium, on the campus of Florence Middle School, is the home to both the University of North Alabama and Florence High School football teams.

Recreation

Parks

Cox Creek Park is home to a children's playground, horseshoe pits, an indoor archery range, and twelve tennis courts. Recent additions have included the new Florence Skate Park, the only skateboard park in the area, and a new stadium for the University of North Alabama softball team. The Florence/Lauderdale Farmer's Market is also located at the park.
Deibert Park was a former horse farm belonging to the Deibert family, the park now includes a playground, picnic shelters, and three ponds. The network of walking trails is enjoyed by walkers, joggers, and bikers. The Children's Museum of the Shoals is also on the park property.
Florence Sportsplex has baseball, softball, and soccer fields. It is located at the corner of Alabama Highway 20 and Gunwaleford Road.
Martin Park is the location for the city swimming facility, at the Royal Avenue Recreation Center. The park is also home to a playground, tennis courts, picnic shelters, and a  fitness trail.
McFarland Park is also the location of the Florence Harbor and Marina. While serving as host to several events throughout the year, the park is also equipped with a playground, numerous picnic shelters, campgrounds, soccer fields, baseball fields, a disc golf course, a golf driving range, and lighted walking trails. Situated along Pickwick Lake, the park is also used by fishermen, boaters, and swimmers.
River Heritage Park is located at the base of the Renaissance Tower and adjacent to the Marriott Shoals Hotel and Conference Center. The park contains scenic overlooks of the Tennessee River and Wilson Dam. Also included are picnic shelters, a playground, and an interactive fountain called the Splash Pad.
Veterans Memorial Park contains a memorial to the war veterans of Florence and Lauderdale county. Twenty-two campsites, six lighted tennis courts, baseball and softball fields, playgrounds, and picnic shelters are also found at the park. Veterans Park is also home to one of the oldest disc golf courses in the state, established in 1983.
Wildwood Park is located adjacent to the University of North Alabama along Cypress Creek. It is the most secluded and serene of the city parks. The park has a pavilion, picnic tables, nature trails, and bicycle trails. Swimming, fishing and canoeing are some of the park's recreational activities.
Wilson Park is located in the heart of downtown, across from the Florence-Lauderdale Public Library. Its grounds are used for numerous festivals and events. The original Plan of Florence in 1818 showed the area as a Public Walk. In 1924, the park was renamed in honor of former U.S. President Woodrow Wilson, shortly after his death.

Other recreation
Blackberry Trail Golf Course – a municipal golf course
Broadway Recreation Center
Florence Harbor – a full-service marina on Tennessee River (Pickwick Lake) mile marker 256
Handy Recreation Center 
Royal Avenue Recreation Center

Transportation

Florence is the merger point for two major U.S. Highways, as well as several Alabama Highways. Both U.S. Highway 43 and U.S. Highway 72 merge just east of the city limits in Killen, and are co-signed their entire length through the city. Highway 43, running north and south, helps connect the city to Lawrenceburg and Columbia to the north in Tennessee, as well as Tuscaloosa and Mobile to the south. Highway 72 helps connect the city to Huntsville and Chattanooga, Tennessee to the east and Memphis, Tennessee to the west. Interstate 65 is accessible about forty-five minutes east on Highway 72. Both of these roads cross the Tennessee River on O'Neal Bridge, connecting Florence to Sheffield.

Alabama state highways that serve the city include State Route 13, State Route 17, State Route 20, State Route 133, and State Route 157. Alabama 133 connected Florence and Muscle Shoals via Wilson Dam until 2002, when the new six-lane "Patton Island Bridge" finished construction. The bridge is part of a new corridor that will eventually  see the widening of Wilson Dam Road in Muscle Shoals to Alabama 20, and the construction of a new road from the bridge to Florence Blvd. in Florence. State Route 157, a road to Florence and the Shoals area, serves as a four-lane link to Interstate 65 in Cullman. the project was completed in the summer of 2007. The road is known as the "University of North Alabama Highway".

Florence and the Shoals area does not have a direct link to an Interstate highway. One solution discussed has been the Memphis to Atlanta Highway, proposed to connect the two cities via a freeway through north Alabama. However, in recent years Mississippi has concentrated its funding on U.S. 78 (Interstate 22), also known as "Corridor X". Though U.S. 72 through Mississippi is four lanes, there are no plans to upgrade it to freeway status. The state of Georgia has also not committed to the necessary work to connect the freeway from the Alabama state line to Atlanta. The highway remains in the planning stages with the Alabama Department of Transportation.

Another plan recently discussed is extending Interstate 565 west from its current terminus just outside Decatur, along Alabama 20/Alternate U.S. 72. The plan has received support from Decatur officials. 

Florence is served by the Northwest Alabama Regional Airport in Muscle Shoals. The airport is used for commercial and general aviation, It is served commercially by Contour Airlines which provides several daily flights to Charlotte Douglas International Airport, an American Airlines hub, giving the city access to hundreds of domestic and international destinations. Huntsville International Airport, another option for Florence residents, offers service to eleven domestic destinations, and is an hour's drive from Florence.

Local industry is served by the Tennessee Southern Railroad (TSRR), which runs from Florence to Columbia, Tennessee, and the Port of Florence on Pickwick Lake.

Media

 TimesDaily, a daily newspaper
Pen-N-Sword
Courier Journal, a direct-mail, weekly newspaper; founded in 1884 as the Florence Herald and renamed in 1982

Numerous radio, television and low-power FM radio stations and translators serve Florence and the greater area, all of which are in the greater Florence MSA. Among them are:

AM radio
 WSBM (1340 AM; 1 kW; Florence, AL; owner: Big River Broadcasting Corporation)
 WBCF (1240 AM; 1 kW; Florence, AL; owner: Benny Carle Broadcasting, Inc.)

FM radio
 W280DA (103.9 FM; Florence, AL; owner: Bible Broadcasting Network, Inc.)
 WQLT-FM (107.3 FM; Florence, AL; owner: Big River Broadcasting Corporation)
 W258AE (99.5 FM; Florence, AL; owner: WAY-FM Media Group, Inc.)
 WWFA-FM (102.7 FM; Florence, AL; owner: Flinn Broadcasting)
 WFIX (91.3 FM; Florence, AL; owner: Tri-State Inspirational B/C Corp.)
 WXFL (96.1 FM; Florence, AL; owner: Big River Broadcasting Corporation)
 W253AH (98.5 FM; Florence, AL; owner: Big River Broadcasting Corporation)
 W276AM (103.1 FM; Florence, ETC., AL; owner: J AND J Broadcasting)
 W225AB (92.9 FM; Florence, AL; owner: William P. Rogers)

Television
 WHDF (Channel 15; Florence, AL; owner: Valley Television, LLC)
 WFIQ (Channel 36; Florence, AL; owner: Alabama Educational Television Commission)
 WAFF-TV (NBC)
 WHNT-TV (CBS)
 WAAY-TV (ABC)
 WZDX-TV (FOX)
 WHDF-TV (The CW)

Past television stations
 WYLE (Channel 26; Florence, AL; owner: ETC Communications Inc.)
 WOWL (Channel 15; Florence, AL)
 W57BV (Channel 57; Florence, AL; owner: Trinity Broadcasting Network)

Cable providers  Florence is served by Comcast and AT&T. Their services include television, internet, home phone, and home security services. Comcast has been a provider of television and other services in the Florence area since the early 1960s. AT&T has provided services to Florence since the early 2000s, when they acquired Bell South. Florence is also served by major satellite television providers, including DirecTV and Dish Network.

Notable people
 
 
Walt Aldridge, songwriter and record producer
Malcolm Armstead, professional basketball player
Ron Billingsley, former professional football player
Whitney Boddie, professional basketball player in the Women's National Basketball Association (WNBA)
Sterling Bose, jazz trumpeter
Jeff Brantley, former Major League Baseball pitcher
Jeff Briggs, video game developer and CEO of Firaxis Games
Roger Briggs, composer
Greg Burdine, member of the Alabama House of Representatives
Thomas Burrows, professional baseball player
The Butler Twins, Detroit blues musicians
Jerry Carrigan, drummer and record producer
Stewart Cink, PGA golfer, 2009 British Open Champion
John Coffee, General during the War of 1812
Dennis Condrey, professional wrestler and member of The Midnight Express
Oscar De Priest, the first African American to be elected to Congress from outside the southern states and the first in the 20th century
Bud Dunn, horse trainer who won the Tennessee Walking Horse World Grand Championship twice
Ronnie Flippo, U.S. Representative from 1977 to 1991
Byron Franklin, former National Football League (NFL) wide receiver
Donnie Fritts, musician and songwriter
Braxton Garrett, professional baseball player for the Miami Marlins
Eric "Red Mouth" Gebhardt, singer-songwriter
Donna Jean Godchaux, singer, The Grateful Dead
Brett Guthrie, U.S. Representative from Kentucky
Elbert Bertram Haltom, Jr., former United States federal judge
W. C. Handy, blues musician, known as "father of the blues"
Dorrit Hoffleit, astronomer
Kelvin Holly, musician, guitarist for Little Richard, The Amazing Rhythm Aces
John Hood, Rear admiral in the United States Navy during World War I
Patterson Hood, guitarist, singer and songwriter for Drive-By Truckers
Autry Inman, rockabilly musician
Tammy Irons, member of the Alabama State Senate
Jason Isbell, musician
Thomas Jeter, fencer
Jim Jones, football player
Buddy Killen, former owner of Killen Music Group
Julianne Kirchner, swimmer
Hank Klibanoff, professor at Emory University 
Adam Lazzara, musician and lead singer of Taking Back Sunday
Lenny LeBlanc, songwriter
Jesse Marsh, comic book artist and animator
Dewey Martin, actor
Floyd Matthews, former member of the United States Navy
Alison McCreary, Miss Alabama 1996
Fran McKee, first female Rear Admiral in the United States Navy
John McKinley, U.S. congressman, senator, and associate justice of the U.S. Supreme Court
Don Leslie Michael, recipient of the Medal of Honor during the Vietnam War
Tom Monroe, disc golfer
Melba Montgomery, country music singer
Charles Moore, civil rights photographer
John Mortvedt, soil scientist at the Tennessee Valley Authority in Muscle Shoals
Harryette Mullen, professor at the University of California, Los Angeles
Emmet O'Neal, 34th Governor of Alabama
Mary Phagan, 13-year-old girl murdered in Atlanta, Georgia, on April 26, 1913
Sam Phillips, record producer, discovered Elvis Presley
Norbert Putnam, record producer
James T. Rapier, U.S. Representative from 1873 to 1875
Billy Reid, fashion designer
Milton P. Rice, former Attorney General of Tennessee and former Secretary of State of Tennessee
Freddie Roach, American football player and coach
Al Romine, former professional football player
Jonathan Rosenbaum, film critic
Wimp Sanderson, former college basketball coach
Dred Scott, of the Dred Scott vs. Sanford case
Oscar Streit, former professional baseball pitcher
T. S. Stribling, 20th-century novelist
Randy Tate, former Major League Baseball pitcher
Mark Thompson, radio personality and member of The Mark & Brian Show
Chris Tompkins, musician and Grammy-winning songwriter
Lamonte Turner, University of Tennessee Basketball player 
Frank R. Walker, rear admiral in the United States Navy during World War II
Gary Weaver, former professional football linebacker
Jessica Wesson, retired actress.
White Dawg, crunk rapper
John Paul White, guitarist, singer and songwriter for Grammy Award-winning duo The Civil Wars
Josh Willingham, former Major League Baseball player, member of 2014 American League champion Kansas City Royals
S. A. M. Wood, Confederate States Army general
Larry Woods, former professional football player
Tom York, television and radio personality

References

External links

Florence Lauderdale Tourism

 
Cities in Alabama
Cities in Lauderdale County, Alabama
Florence–Muscle Shoals metropolitan area
County seats in Alabama
1818 establishments in Alabama Territory
Populated places established in 1818
Alabama populated places on the Tennessee River